Telling All My Secrets is the second studio album by American country music singer-songwriter Mitchell Tenpenny, and his major-label debut. It was released through Columbia Nashville and Riser House Records on December 14, 2018. The lead single, "Drunk Me", reached the top 10 on the Billboard Country Airplay chart. Tenpenny co-wrote all eleven tracks on the album. Tenpenny produced the album with Jordan Schmidt except for "Alcohol You Later", which was produced by Sam Sumser, and "I Get the Picture", "Somebody Ain't You", and the title track, which Tenpenny produced with Paul DiGiovanni.

Commercial performance
Telling All My Secrets debuted at number five on Billboards Top Country Albums chart and number 53 on the Billboard 200, based on 20,000 album equivalent units. On the Billboard 200, it left the top 100 the week of January 5, 2019 and spent eight weeks on the chart. It has sold 31,000 copies in pure album sales in the United States as of July 2019.

Track listing

Personnel
Adapted from AllMusic

Andy Albert - background vocals
Tom Beaupre - bass guitar
Marc Beeson - background vocals
Devin Dawson - banjo
Paul DiGiovanni - guitar programming
Justin Ebach - programming
Travis Harper - background vocals
Mark Hill - bass guitar
Derek Johnson - drums
Hillary Lindsey - background vocals
Michael Lotten - acoustic guitar, electric guitar
Steve Markland - background vocals
Matthew McVaney - programming
Garrett Perales - electric guitar
Jordan Schmidt - programming
Jimmie Lee Sloas - bass guitar
Sam Sumser - bass guitar, acoustic guitar, electric guitar, keyboards, programming
Mitchell Tenpenny - banjo, acoustic guitar, electric guitar, lead vocals, background vocals
Rafe Tenpenny - background vocals
Ilya Toshinsky - banjo, dobro, acoustic guitar, electric guitar, mandolin
Derek Wells - electric guitar
Dallas Wilson - background vocals
Lonnie Wilson - drums
Alex Wright - Fender Rhodes, keyboards, organ, piano, programming, Wurlitzer
Nir Z. - drums

Charts

Album

Weekly charts

Year-end charts

Singles

References

2018 albums
Mitchell Tenpenny albums
Columbia Records albums
Albums produced by Jordan Schmidt